Lesley Fera (born November 23, 1971) is an American actress. She is best known for her role as Veronica Hastings on the ABC Family series Pretty Little Liars. Fera also had a recurring roles in 24, CSI: Miami and Southland, as well as performing in a number of theater productions.
She launched a podcast to discuss Pretty Little Liars in 2020.

Biography

A native Californian, Lesley is a lover of the stage, she is very active in L.A. theatre and has also enjoyed working at numerous regional theaters. She portrayed Veronica Hastings on Pretty Little Liars from 2010 to 2017.

Filmography

Film

Television

Stage

References

External links

20th-century American actresses
21st-century American actresses
American film actresses
American stage actresses
American television actresses
Living people
Place of birth missing (living people)
1971 births